HD 166066 is a solitary star located in the southern circumpolar constellation Octans. It has an apparent magnitude of 8.10, making it readily visible in binoculars, but not to the naked eye.

HD 166066 has a stellar classification of G0 V, indicating that it is a G-type main sequence star similar to the Sun. However, the calcium H & K lines are narrow and weak for its class. It has 113% the mass of the Sun and 139% its radius, along with twice its luminosity. 

References

G-type main-sequence stars
091434
166066
CD-85 00150
Octans